The list of ship commissionings in 1924 includes a chronological list of all ships commissioned in 1924.



1924